McKie is a surname. Notable people with the surname include:

Aaron McKie (born 1972), American basketball player
Angus McKie, English illustrator
BJ McKie (born 1977), American basketball player
David McKie (born 1935), British journalist and historian
Evan McKie (born 1983), Canadian ballet dancer
Helen McKie (1889–1957), British artist and illustrator
James McKie (born 1870s), Scottish footballer
Jason McKie (born 1980), American football player
Phyllis McKie (died 1983), Canadian historian and photographer
Rod McKie, British cartoonist
Ronald McKie (1909–1991), Australian novelist
Roy McKie, American illustrator
Shirley McKie, Scottish police officer
William McKie (1901–1984), Australian organist, conductor and composer
William McKie (1886–1956), British wrestler

See also
Mackie (surname)
Mickey (disambiguation)